Gasanova is the second studio album by American rapper Yung Gravy, released on October 2, 2020, by Republic Records. The album features appearances by Ski Mask the Slump God, TrippythaKid, Bobby Raps, Young Dolph, bbno$, Chief Keef, and Y2K.

Background and promotion
Prior to the release of the project, Gravy released two music videos. On April 22, 2020, the video for "Tampa Bay Bustdown" was published, featuring Gravy alongside featured artists Chief Keef and Y2K. On September 2, 2020, Gravy released the video for "Yup!", which tells the story Bruce Buttercrisp, the character Gravy plays in the video.

In collaboration with clothing brand PizzaSlime, a wave of merchandise inspired by Gasanova arrived on September 16, 2020.

Gravy took to Twitter on September 29, 2020, to announce the album, revealing the title, cover art, and track list.

During a virtual press conference on September 30, 2020, Rowdy Magazine asked Gravy to describe Gasanovas "vibe" in three words. He said: "It thumps. It's carefree. It's gas."

The main line of Gasanova merchandise was released  alongside the album through Gravy's official webstore titled Creamium.

Following the album's release, Gravy released music videos for the songs "Gas Money" and "Miami Ice".

Track listing

Notes

 "Oops!", "Yup!", and "Jack Money Bean" are stylized in lowercase. For example, "Yup!" is stylized as "yup!"
Sample credits

 "Oops!" contains samples from "Fuck the Pain Away", written and performed by Peaches.

Charts

References

2020 albums
Republic Records albums
Yung Gravy albums